Bulgaria–Hungary relations are foreign relations between Bulgaria and Hungary. Both independent countries have had diplomatic relations since 1920. They were on the same side during World War I and World War II. Since 2016, the two countries have commemorated their friendly relationship on 19 October, which is known in Bulgaria as the Day of Bulgarian-Hungarian Friendship, and in Hungary as the Day of Hungarian-Bulgarian Friendship.

Bulgaria has an embassy in Budapest. Hungary has an embassy in Sofia and an honorary consulate in Varna.

Both countries are full members of the European Union and NATO.
Bulgaria in as member of the EU in 2007 and NATO in 2004. Hungary in as member of the EU in 2004 and NATO in 1999.

Resident diplomatic missions
 Bulgaria has an embassy in Budapest and honorary consulate in Kecskemét.
 Hungary has an embassy in Sofia.

See also 
 Foreign relations of Bulgaria
 Foreign relations of Hungary
 Bulgarians in Hungary

References

External links
  Bulgarian embassy in Budapest
  Hungarian embassy in Sofia

 
Hungary 
Bilateral relations of Hungary